Bryant Nathaniel Koback (born April 6, 1998) is an American football running back who is a free agent. He played college football at Toledo and also was enrolled at Kentucky but he never played for the Wildcats.

High school career
Koback attended Springfield High School in Holland, Ohio. He played in four games his senior year before suffering a season-ending broken leg. During his career he had over 4,400 yards and 57 touchdowns. He committed to play college football at the University of Kentucky.

College career
Koback attended Kentucky in 2017, but did not play in any games. In 2018, he transferred to the University of Toledo. In his first year at Toledo in 2018, he led the team with 917 rushing yards on 153 carries with 14 touchdowns. In 2019, Koback rushed for 1,187 yards on 195 carries with 12 touchdowns. In 2020, he had 522 yards on 123 carries with four touchdowns and in 2021, he had 1,407 yards on 208 carries with 15 touchdowns. At the end of his college career, he played in the 2022 Hula Bowl, where he was named the offensive MVP of his team.

Professional career
Koback was signed by the Minnesota Vikings as a undrafted free agent on May 2, 2022. He was waived on August 30, 2022 and re-signed to the practice squad the next day.

References

External links
 Minnesota Vikings bio
Toledo Rockets bio
 Kentucky Wildcats bio

1998 births
Living people
Players of American football from Ohio
American football running backs
Kentucky Wildcats football players
Toledo Rockets football players
Minnesota Vikings players
People from Holland, Ohio